Bijar may refer to:
 Bijar (city), a city in Kordestan Province, Iran
 Bijar County
 Bijar, Nehbandan, a village in South Khorasan Province, Iran
 Bijar, Punjab, a village in Pakistan
 Bijar rug, a type of Persian carpet

See also 
 Bejar (disambiguation)